Kristian Kristiansen may refer to:
Kristian Kristiansen (writer) (1909–1980), Norwegian writer
Kristian Kristiansen (explorer) (1865–1943), Norwegian explorer who participated in the first documented crossing of Greenland
Kristian Kristiansen (archaeologist) (born 1948), Danish archaeologist and professor at the University of Gothenburg